Man and Wife may refer to:

Man and Wife (novel), an 1870 novel by Wilkie Collins
Man and Wife (film), a 1923 American silent film
 Man and Wife, a 2003 novel by Tony Parsons
 Man and Wife, a 1976 poem by Robert Lowell